John Dennistoun (19 March 1803 – 9 September 1870) was a British Whig politician and banker.

His wife Frances was the daughter of Sir Henry Onslow.

References

External links
 

UK MPs 1835–1837
UK MPs 1837–1841
UK MPs 1841–1847
Whig (British political party) MPs for Scottish constituencies
1803 births
1870 deaths
Politicians from Glasgow
People educated at the High School of Glasgow
Businesspeople from Glasgow
Alumni of the University of Glasgow